Edmund Elias Merhige, known as E. Elias Merhige (pronounced like marriage; born June 14, 1964), is an American film director born in Brooklyn, New York City.

Work
Merhige is known to mainstream audiences for his work on the 2000 film Shadow of the Vampire and to underground audiences for the cult 1989 film Begotten. He has also directed music videos for Marilyn Manson.

Merhige started in the New York theatre scene, and first conceived Begotten as a work of experimental theatre, casting many actors from his company in supporting roles. Following the release of his last feature film Suspect Zero, Merhige has mostly returned to work in the theatre.

Critical reception
Eugene Thacker, writing about Begotten, placed Merhige's work "between genre horror and performance art," marking Begotten as a "ritual in cinematic time," and concluding that the next step in Merhige's art offering "presumably, would be to allow everything to dissolve - human into non-human, body into environment, image into emulsions of gelatin, crystal, and camphor."

Filmography

Features
 Begotten (1989)
 Shadow of the Vampire (2000)
 Suspect Zero (2004)

Short films
 Implosion (1983)
 Spring Reign (1984)
 A Taste of Youth (1985)
 Din of Celestial Birds (2006)

Music videos 
 "Cryptorchid" – Marilyn Manson
 "Antichrist Superstar" – Marilyn Manson
 "The Heinrich Maneuver" – Interpol
 "Serpentia" – Danzig

References

External links

American music video directors
1964 births
Living people
People from Brooklyn
Horror film directors
Film directors from New York City